Tariano Adaryll "Taj" Jackson II (born August 4, 1973) is an American singer, songwriter, producer, and director. He is an original member of 3T along with his brothers; Taryll Adren Jackson and Tito Joe ("TJ") Jackson. His career and solo work include a reality television series for which he was executive producer. His band 3T currently still tours, and he works as a spokesperson on behalf of the Jackson family.

Early life and education 

Tariano Adaryll "Taj" Jackson II was born on August 4, 1973 in Los Angeles, California. He is the first child of father Tito Jackson and mother Delores "Dee Dee" Martes. He is also the nephew of Rebbie, Jackie, Jermaine, La Toya, Marlon, Michael, Randy, and Janet. He has two younger brothers; Taryll Adren Jackson and Tito Joe Jackson ("TJ"). Jackson's parents were married in June 1972, and later divorced in 1988. His father Tito coached them in baseball.

Jackson graduated from Buckley School in 1991. He also studied television production and recording arts at Loyola Marymount University, with a minor in music.

Career

3T

Under the guidance of their father Tito and uncle Michael, Jackson and his brothers formed the group 3T. Their late uncle Michael mentored and signed them to his label MJJ Music. Their debut album Brotherhood was released in 1995. The album sold over three million copies worldwide, with their debut single "Anything".

3T recorded an album after Brotherhood, which was never released because Sony, their label at the time, had a strained relationship with Michael (MJJ Music). 3T released two more albums; Identity in 2004, and Chapter III in 2015. 3T have also written and produced soundtracks to films such as; The Jacksons: An American Dream, Free Willy, Free Willy 2: The Adventure Home, Men in Black and Trippin'. Taj has used his education in television to direct music videos and documentary series.

As of 2022, 3T are still touring, headlining concerts and music festivals.

Reality series (2015–2016)
In October 2015, Taj, Taryll, and TJ Jackson starred in and co-produced the reality series The Jacksons: Next Generation. The series aired on Lifetime (TV network) in USA, Canada, UK, Ireland, Asia (2016) and South Africa from 2015 to 2016.

Solo work and other projects 
In 2014, Big Screen Entertainment Group optioned the rights to Code Z,  a script by Jackson and the Brazilian Sco triplets (Thaisa, Thaina, and Thayana Sco). Jackson directed the short film. In 2015, he was executive producer of the reality television series The Jacksons: Next Generation together with his brothers Taryll and TJ.

In 2018, Jackson directed the music video for 3T's song "Fire". He also took up photography. His uncle Michael bought him his first camera and video camera. 
Jackson is currently working on a new documentary series, in which he intends to correct what he sees as misconceptions about his uncle Michael Jackson. The series is planned for release in 2023.

Personal life

Family
Taj Jackson married Thayana Sco Jackson on June 16, 2013, at Hayvenhurst, the Jackson family home. His uncle Jermaine Jackson performed in honor of the couple. Together they have two daughters; Taylor Aurora Sco Jackson (born November 21, 2018) and Toria Katherine Sco Jackson (born May 8, 2021).

He later in life said that he was abused by an uncle on his mother's side when he was a child, and that his uncle Michael was nurturing and supportive during this time. Growing up, Taj and his brothers observed their uncles' group the Jackson 5, and they gravitated toward the music industry. Their mother, Dee Dee wanted her children to experience a more typical American childhood.

In August 1994, their mother, Dee Dee was found dead in her backyard swimming pool in Ladera Heights, California. In August 1995, Jackson and other members of his family filed a wrongful death suit against her then-boyfriend, Don Bohana. Her death was originally ruled accidental. Later, Bohana was charged with the murder, and found guilty of second-degree murder in 1998.

Charity work 
After the loss of their mother Dee Dee, Jackson and his brothers launched a non-profit organization, the Dee Dee Jackson Foundation, to support people who have lost family members through community and music therapy. In 2021, The Dee Dee Jackson Foundation won a HOPEE Award (Helping Others Practice Enduring Empowerment), an award given to various charitable organizations for excellence in the work performed by the foundation. To help raise money for charity, Taj collaborates with his younger cousin, Prince Michael Jackson, also known as Bigi, to design haunted house for Thriller Night, a Halloween costume party sponsored by the Heal Los Angeles Foundation.

Advocacy for Michael Jackson

During and after the 2019 release of 'Leaving Neverland,' Jackson launched a media tour to defend his Uncle Michael Jackson from the film's allegations, which he referred to as being one-sided. He provided interviews with himself and other Jackson family members. Jackson has said that the allegations against Michael Jackson were false and defamatory and to defend his stance, Jackson underscores the FBI files on Michael Jackson and asserts that the FBI investigations had turned up no evidence of criminal conduct on his uncle's part. Jackson said that he felt betrayed by Wade Robson, who asked him to help get seats for him and his whole family at Michael's 2009 memorial. In some of these interviews Taj Jackson said that he had known Robson for years, and that his cousin Brandi Jackson had a childhood relationship with Robson that turned intimate in their teens during the years that Robson alleges abuse. Both Taj and Brandi Jackson appeared in the documentary Neverland Firsthand: Investigating the Michael Jackson Documentary, about the allegations of abuse against Michael Jackson by Robson and James Safechuck in Leaving Neverland.

Jackson is currently working on a documentary series planned for release in 2023.

He appeared in the 2019 documentary Square One: Michael Jackson an investigative documentary about the original 1993 child sexual abuse accusations against Michael Jackson. In this documentary, Jackson defends himself and his uncle Michael Jackson against allegations from a criminal behavioral profiler.

In November 2020, British journalist Martin Bashir was publicly criticized about his tactics to get Diana, Princess of Wales to agree to their 1995 interview. Jackson and his family subsequently opened a new investigation into Bashir for the tactics he used to get Michael Jackson to agree to their interview which led to the documentary Living with Michael Jackson.

In August 2022, Rolling Stone magazine referred to Harry Styles as the "new King of Pop." The article was criticized by Jackson fans and Taj Jackson, who suggested that Styles could have his own title, and that the honorary name was trademarked by Jackson's companies and could not be claimed by anyone else.

On March 7, 2023, Jackson took to Twitter calling Chris Rock out for comparing convicted sexual predator R. Kelly to his acquitted uncle Michael in a Netflix special. “Chris Rock has used my family as punching bags for his entire career. Yet I am supposed to feel bad for him getting slapped and humiliated on the Oscars,” he wrote. "What did my family ever do to you to warrant these decades of harassment and your constant bullying disguised as jokes?”, he continued. Jackson ended his statement thanking Will Smith who assaulted Rock at the Academy Awards.

References

External links
 
 Dee Dee Jackson Foundation
 Heal Los Angeles Foundation

1973 births
Living people
20th-century American singers
21st-century American singers
African-American male singers
African-American songwriters
African-American television producers
American contemporary R&B singers
American humanitarians
American male pop singers
American male singers
American male songwriters
American music video directors
American philanthropists
American reality television producers
American soul singers
Epic Records artists
Jackson family (show business)
Loyola Marymount University alumni
Singers from Los Angeles
Songwriters from California
Television producers from California